Chance is an unincorporated community in Adair County, Kentucky, United States.  Its elevation is 1017 feet (310 m).

References

Further reading
 

Unincorporated communities in Adair County, Kentucky
Unincorporated communities in Kentucky